The Friends Meeting House and Cemetery is a historic Quaker meeting house and cemetery at 228A W. Main Road in Little Compton, Rhode Island.  The meeting house is a two-story wood-frame structure built in 1815 by the Religious Society of Friends, commonly known as Quakers, on the site of their first meeting house built in 1700 on land granted to John Irish.  The new meeting house used some materials from the original one.  It was then modified in 1870.

The meeting house was used by Quakers until 1903, and was maintained by members of the Apponegansett Meeting House in Dartmouth, Massachusetts until 1946, when it was donated to the Little Compton Historical Society.  It was the Society's first acquisition, and was subjected to a careful restoration beginning in 1963 to restore it to the condition it was in during 1815.

The cemetery, designated Rhode Island Historic Cemetery No. 7, is approximately a 71 foot by 41 foot (21.64m x 12.5m) rectangle located to the east (rear) of the meeting house.  The earliest dated burials are from 1714 and 1729, and the latest is from 1903. There are 18 inscribed headstones in total, plus multiple uninscribed fleldstone and slate headstones.

The meeting house and cemetery were listed on the National Register of Historic Places in 2007.

See also
 National Register of Historic Places listings in Newport County, Rhode Island
 Wilbor House, another property of the Little Compton Historical Society

References

External links

 Little Compton Historical Society

Cemeteries on the National Register of Historic Places in Rhode Island
Churches completed in 1815
19th-century Quaker meeting houses
Churches in Newport County, Rhode Island
Quaker cemeteries
Quaker meeting houses in Rhode Island
Churches on the National Register of Historic Places in Rhode Island
Tourist attractions in Newport County, Rhode Island
Buildings and structures in Little Compton, Rhode Island
National Register of Historic Places in Newport County, Rhode Island